Crassula falcata (now correctly named Crassula perfoliata var. minor), known by the common names airplane plant and propeller plant, is a succulent plant endemic to South Africa, from the Cape of Good Hope. The flowers are tiny and scarlet red, that rise in dense clusters above the foliage for a month in summer. Crassula falcata is cultivated for use in drought tolerant and succulent gardens, and in container gardens.

References 

falcata
Endemic flora of South Africa
Garden plants of Africa
Drought-tolerant plants